The Lakeshore School District in Southwestern lower Michigan serves the communities of Stevensville and Baroda in Berrien County.

History

The district was formed by the merging of the two high school systems of Baroda, Michigan and Stevensville, Michigan in 1957.

A fourth elementary school, Stevensville Elementary School occupying two buildings (one formerly Stevensville High School), was closed in 1979 and demolished later.
A fifth elementary school, Baroda Elementary School (formerly Baroda High School), was closed in 1981 and demolished in 2006.

Schools
Lakeshore has three primary schools and two secondary schools.

Secondary schools
Lakeshore High School - 9th through 12th grades
Lakeshore Middle School - 6th through 8th grades

Elementary schools
Hollywood Elementary School
Roosevelt Elementary School
Stewart Elementary School

See also
List of school districts in Michigan

References

External links

School districts in Michigan
Education in Berrien County, Michigan